Alexander Konstantinovich Mordvilko (born 3 February 1867 in the area of Minsk – died 12 July 1938 in the area of Leningrad) was a Russian entomologist and parasitologist.

References

1867 births
1938 deaths
Russian entomologists
Soviet entomologists
Russian parasitologists
Soviet parasitologists